Nikolai Kuznetsov (1864-1932) was a botanist.

1905–1911 he was the president of Estonian Naturalists' Society.

He has described over 30 plant taxa, including:
 Cynanchum albowianum Kusn., Fl. Caucas. Crit. iv. I. 445 (1905)
 Cynanchum boissieri Kusn., Fl. Caucas. Crit. iv. I. 455 (1905)
 Cynanchum funebre Kusn., Fl. Caucas. Crit. iv. I. 461 (1905)

References

1864 births
1932 deaths
20th-century Estonian botanists
19th-century Estonian botanists